Albert Moukheiber (1912 - 2002) was a Lebanese doctor, politician and a former Lebanese Parliamentary member who was widely known for is opposition to the Syrian military presence in Lebanon. He was also co-founder of the National Bloc Party.

Career 
Albert Moukheiber was a deputy in the Lebanese Parliament since 1957, with the acceptation of 1992. He won in the 1960 elections and in 1964 elections in alliance with the National Liberal Party under the leadership of Camille Chamoun, and in 1968 he won his parliamentary seat in alliance with Representative Jamil Lahoud and in 1972. He was also elected as a deputy in the year 2000, representing the district of Matn, but he did not complete his term and died two years in his term.

Ministries 
Among the many positions he held during his long political career were the position of Deputy Prime Minister in the government of President Saeb Salam (1972-1973), Minister of State in the government of Prime Minister Takieddin Solh (1973-1974), and Deputy Speaker of the Lebanese Parliament.

Death 
He died in 2002 at the age of 88, before completing his term of officer and his political legacy was succeeded by his nephew Ghassan Moukheiber.

References 

National Bloc (Lebanon) politicians
Deputy prime ministers of Lebanon
1912 births
2002 deaths
Lebanese physicians
20th-century Lebanese politicians
Greek Orthodox Christians from Lebanon